Ralf Johannes Radlanski (born  in Paris) is a German anatomist, orthodontist and university professor. Since 1992 he is director of the Dept. of Craniofacial Developmental Biology at the Center for Dental and Craniofacial Sciences, Charité – University Medicine Berlin (Germany). He is a guest professor at the University of California, San Francisco (USA), at the University of Turku (Finland), at the University of Queensland, Brisbane, and at the University of Basle (Switzerland).

Career 
Ralf J. Radlanski studied medicine and dentistry at the Universities of Göttingen (Germany) and Minneapolis (MN, USA). He received his postgraduate education at the Institute of Anatomy at the University of Göttingen and he underwent a residency in orthodontics at the medical faculty of Göttingen University. In 1992 he was appointed professor and director of the Dept. of Craniofacial Developmental Biology at the Center for Dental and Craniofacial Sciences, Charité – University Medicine Berlin (Germany). His scientific work is focused on the visualization of prenatal craniofacial morphogenesis, as well as on microstructural research. Furthermore, he has contributed to practical orthodontic questions. Currently, the Radlanski Collection, consisting of 50,000 serial sections of human embryos and fetuses is being digitized. 

Radlanski is the author of over 100 scientific articles, has written and contributed to about a dozen textbooks and has given lectures in Europe, Africa, Asia, and the USA.

With his violoncello, Ralf J. Radlanski is a member of the Berliner Ärzte-Orchester and the World Doctors Orchestra.

Science management 
 President and organizer of the 10th International Symposium of Dental Morphology, 1995 in Berlin
 National Delegate and Managing Board of the COST B 28 action (Craniofacial Morphogenesis) 2001–2008
 President and organizer of the 10th Tooth Morphogenesis and Tissue Differentiation Symposium 2010 in Berlin
 President of the International Orthodontic Symposium in 2004, 2006–2019 in Prague

Honorary appointments 
 President of the EurAsian Association of Orthodontists (EAO)
 President of the Written Art Foundation

Selected publications 
 Mein Gesicht, Quintessenz, Berlin 2016. 
 The Face. Pictorial Atlas of Clinical Anatomy. Quintessence Publ. Co. Chicago 2012 (with Karl H. Wesker) 
 Oral Structure & Biology (Textbook), Quintessence Publishing, Batavia, IL, USA 2018 
 Facial Growth – Dynamics of Orthodontics, Vol 2a, (with Frans van der Linden und James McNamara),  Quintessence Publ., Chicago 2006 
 Normal Development of the Dentition, Malocclusions and interventions - Dynamics of Orthodontics, Vol. 3 a,b (with Frans van der Linden und James McNamara), Quintessence Publ., 
 Facial Growth, Dentition and Function - Dynamics of Orthodontics, Vol. 5 (with Frans van der Linden und James McNamara), Quintessence Publ.,

References

External links 
 Official Website of the Institute of Craniofacial Developmental Biology
 List of publications and scientific papers

German anatomists
1958 births
Living people
University of Göttingen alumni
University of Minnesota alumni
University of California, San Francisco faculty